SS Koombana was a late Edwardian-era passenger, cargo and mail carrying steamship.  From March 1909 to March 1912, she operated coastal liner services between Fremantle, Western Australia and various ports in the northwest of that state.  She is best known for disappearing at an unknown location north of Port Hedland, Western Australia, during a tropical cyclone on 20 March 1912, killing 74 passengers and 76 crew; in total, 150 people died.

Other than a small quantity of wreckage, no trace was ever found of the ship, which was presumed sunk along with several other vessels during the same storm.  At least a further 15 people died in other ships and near the cyclone.  As accurate passenger lists were not kept at the time, the exact number of deaths is not known; however, all on board are presumed to have perished. The loss was almost certainly Australia's worst weather-related maritime disaster in the twentieth century.

In her short career, Koombana also played a significant role in the public life of Western Australia.  In April/May 1909, she carried the Premier of Western Australia, Newton Moore, on a tour of the northwest, which included the official opening of the jetty at Port Hedland, now the highest tonnage port in Australia.  Koombana was also the first ship to berth at that jetty.

Twelve months later, in Fremantle, she was the subject of a divisive industrial dispute that had nationwide implications.

Additionally, the loss of Koombana, and the associated withdrawal of her owner, the Adelaide Steamship Company, from the northwest coastal trade, was a major impetus for the early development of the State Shipping Service of Western Australia, which was to dominate that trade for the rest of the twentieth century.

Concept and construction

Koombana was the first passenger and cargo vessel to be built exclusively for service on the Western Australian coast, and her mission was to develop trade with the north west of the State. Owned and operated by the Adelaide Steamship Company, she was constructed under the British Corporation shelter deck rules, to carry first and second class passengers, a large number of cattle, and a considerable amount of general cargo.

When the order for Koombana was placed, the Adelaide Steamship Company was the major operator of coastal shipping between Fremantle and Western Australia's northern ports.  Since 1900, the service had been provided by SS Bullarra; Koombana was ordered as Bullarras much larger replacement. In the design of Koombana, special attention was given to her intended engagement in this unusual semi-tropical trade.

Of steel construction, Koombana was built in Linthouse, a district of Glasgow, Scotland, by shipbuilders Alex. Stephen & Sons, and launched on 27 October 1908, following a delay owing to labor troubles. Her naming ceremony was performed by Mrs S Elgar, wife of one of the owner's superintendents in England. At the suggestion of the Premier, Newton Moore, she was named Koombana, after Mr Robert Forrest's "Koombana" mill, near Bunbury, Western Australia.

The name Koombana also conformed with the owner's established tradition of using a local Aboriginal language word as the name of each of its ships.  "Koombana", first recorded by John Arrowsmith in 1838 as "Koombanah", is the Noongar name of a bay, now known as Koombana Bay, adjacent to Bunbury. The word "Koombana" has been defined as meaning bay ("ana") of spouting whales ("koomba"), and also as meaning "calm and peaceful". In view of Koombanas ultimate fate, the latter definition may now convey a touch of irony.

By the standards of the time, Koombana was a modern, luxury vessel, and contrasted starkly with the corrugated iron and canvas of the ports she was built to serve.  She has been described as being "... as luxurious as the Titanic ..." and as "... the last word in seagoing opulence". Following her arrival in Fremantle during her delivery voyage, she was praised as "... the acme of perfection as regards the comfort of passengers, facilities for handling cargo, and appliances for skilful navigation ...". However, she was also criticised as "... too good for the trade".

All of her compartments were fitted with watertight doors, and she was capable of carrying 900 tons of ballast water.

Architecture and equipment

Passenger facilities
[[File:SS Koombana, first class dining saloon 1909.jpg|thumb|right|250px|Koombana '''s first class dining room, .]]Koombana had a number of decks with passenger facilities.  Immediately above the lower hold was the orlop deck, and above that, the main deck.  The latter was topped by the spar deck, which had most of the passenger cabins and dining saloons. Over the spar deck was a promenade deck, which was crowned by the bridge and boat deck, with the navigating bridge on top.

The drawing and smoke rooms were both located on the promenade deck.  Each was lavishly decorated and handsomely appointed, with particular attention being paid to the colours of the upholstery. In the drawing room, there were portable lounges and Waring & Co furnishings, all upholstered in purple plush. The drawing room was also equipped with satinwood panelled walls, an elaborate bookcase with up-to-date library, and other furniture, including a Broadway piano and a pair of Chippendale-style writing desks.  Its ceilings were white painted canvas with a gilt-edged floral design; its main entrance and the stairway leading to the promenade deck were both panelled in mahogany.  The smoke room was upholstered in scarlet.Koombanas dining room in the first saloon was roomy, well ventilated, and had green-upholstered seating for 75 people.  Its walls were panelled in oak.  The galley and pantries were provided with up-to-date appliances, including a patent electric egg boiler in the kitchen, and an electrically driven dough mixer in the bakehouse.

The cabins were well ventilated and appointed, and most contained only two berths. All had electric fans. The first class cabins were constructed according to the island system, with each division having a separate entrance from the deck, and easy access to and from the saloon. Accommodation for second class passengers was particularly good.

MachineryKoombana′s inverted steam engines, supplied by the builders, and her Babcock & Wilcox water-tube boilers, were shipped at Princes Dock, Glasgow. The engines were triple expansion, but not duplicate, and were equipped with all the latest auxiliary equipment.  The tailing shaft was 25% above requirements.  Koombana's indicated speed was 14 knots, and she had an average speed, fully laden, of 13 knots.  Koombana was also equipped with a Clayton fire extinguishing and disinfecting installation.

On Koombanas bridge was a variety of instruments and machines, including the latest navigation appliances.  Bridge equipment included an Alfred Graham patent telephone switch, which connected the bridge with the captain's cabin, the poop, and the engine-room.  The telephone was used in emergencies, or when the officers on the bridge wanted to be more explicit in their instructions to the engine-room.  It was supplemented by a telegraph, for communications between the bridge and the aft end of the vessel. Also on the bridge were a number of automatic indicators, a telemotor to control the steering gear, and a portable chart table in a glass.

Elsewhere, Koombana was fitted with electric sidelights with auxiliary oil lamps, along with another set of indicators to warn of failure of any of the navigational lights. The indicators were in the form of discs in the wheel house; if anything were to go wrong with a designated light, a coloured flame would flare up in the respective disc, and if no attention were paid to it, an electric bell would ring.

A special item carried by Koombana was a motor launch.  It was intended to be used when Koombana missed the tide at various northwestern ports, and would be sent ashore if necessary.

Cargo facilities
Koombana had been designed and constructed with particular attention to the conveyance of livestock.  Her main deck, running fore and aft, was equipped with special pens for transporting about 220 head of cattle or 1,500 sheep. However, as early as her second north west coastal run she was shipped with 2,500 sheep for carriage from Carnarvon to Fremantle.

Additionally, Koombana was fitted with powerful refrigerating engines supplied by Messrs J and E Hall, Ltd, London, and two large freezing chambers, with a total capacity of 1,800 tons of cubic space, for the carriage of perishable commodities. These chambers were capable of dealing with about 800 tons of cargo, and were supplemented by an icemaking machine.

Koombanas seven sets of Welin quadrant davits were all worked by hydraulic power, apart from one steam crane at the No 1 hatch for'ard.

Service history

Delivery voyage

At the end of December 1908, Koombana departed from the United Kingdom on her delivery voyage to Melbourne, Australia, via Cape Town and Durban in South Africa, and Fremantle and Adelaide in Australia. Her master for the delivery voyage was Captain John Rees, who was said to be well known on the north west coast. Formerly the master of Bullara, he had been "sent home specially for the purpose".

Koombana left Glasgow on 29 December 1908 during a severe snowstorm.  After 36 hours' delay at Greenock awaiting snowbound passengers, she made a 7am start for Australia on 31 December 1908.  On the run down the Irish Channel and across the Bay of Biscay, she experienced fine weather.  She passed Las Palmas on 6 January 1909, Cape Verde three days later, and crossed the equator on 13 January 1909.  The weather remained favourable until three days out of Cape Town, when strong winds and heavy seas hampered her progress.  She arrived in Cape Town on 23 January 1909, embarked passengers, and departed the following day.

On arrival at Durban on 27 January 1909, Koombana took on a large number of passengers bound for Australian ports, among them a certain J H Taylor.  Two days after the vessel's departure for Fremantle, on 30 January 1909, Mr Taylor mysteriously disappeared without trace.  In the interim, he had been observed to be behaving in a peculiar and eccentric manner.  He had also informed other passengers that he had been in South Africa for some years, and had lost a lot of money.  It was therefore assumed that "his losses had preyed upon his mind", and that "in a fit of melancholia", he had "jumped overboard in the night". Meanwhile, fine weather prevailed down to the 28th parallel.  On 5 February 1909, Koombana passed Amsterdam Island.  From there to Fremantle, she encountered strong southerly winds and heavy beam seas.

Koombana arrived in Fremantle for the first time on 11 February 1909. The cargo she unloaded there included a valuable shipment of thoroughbred and Suffolk Punch horses, a Dorset horn ram and five Dorset horn ewes in lamb, all consigned to Mr A E Cockram. A well known ex-Australian trainer, Edwin Couch, had been engaged to accompany the horses from Glasgow to Fremantle.  But after apparently displaying great interest in the matter, he had failed to appear to carry out his engagement, which had therefore had to be carried out by "another good man".  Couch had later been discovered to have used a revolver to commit suicide in an Exeter hotel.

On 12 February 1909, Koombana continued on her voyage to Melbourne to be docked. At a reception held on board her in Melbourne on 5 March 1909, the federal Attorney-General, W M Hughes, responded to a toast to the Commonwealth Parliament by acknowledging the immense proportions that the Australian shipping industry had recently assumed.  His Western Australian colleague Senator George Pearce, Minister for Defence, also gave a speech, in which he attributed the moves to establish a Royal Australian Navy to the need to keep the way open for coastal trade.  In another speech, the Minister for Home Affairs, Hugh Mahon, who was also the federal Member for Coolgardie in Western Australia, asserted not only that the coastal trade was one of Australia's most precious possessions, but also, somewhat presciently, that no sacrifice should be too great to preserve it.

Soon afterwards, Koombana returned to Fremantle to replace SS Bullarra on the north-west trade. Shortly before dawn on 8 March 1909, she berthed at Victoria Quay, Fremantle, to complete the delivery process. During the delivery voyage, her seagoing qualities had proved to be exceptionally fine.

Early north west trips

Koombana departed from Fremantle on her maiden north west trip to Derby on 12 March 1909, and from Geraldton the following night.  She was expected to reach Carnarvon on the evening of 15 March 1909, but that morning she ran aground on a sand bank known as Bar Flats,  from Denham in Shark Bay.

A subsequent inquiry by the Chief Harbourmaster, Captain C J Irvine, established that the master, Captain Rees, had mistaken the mark buoy in the north side of the channel leading to Denham for the outer or westerly buoy.  In the hazy prevailing weather, Captain Rees had been prevented from verifying his position by bearings from the headlands, and there was little warning of the approach of shoal waters.  The Chief Harbourmaster therefore concluded that more care should have been exercised when approaching Bar Flats, and the speed of the ship reduced to "slow" until the vessel's position had been definitely ascertained.  However, in light of Captain Rees's past good record, and in the absence of any damage to the ship, he recommended that no further action be taken.

Initially, Captain Rees expected to be able to float Koombana off the sand bank the next day. With the haze having lifted by the following morning, the ship became visible from Denham by the aid of glasses.  Efforts were made to refloat her by emptying the ballast tanks, etc., but to no avail. Crew members then sent the motor launch towards Denham, but in the heavy seas its motor was swamped, and it returned to Koombana using its sail.  Denham was reached only on a second attempt.

On 18 March 1909 at 02:30, the SS Winfield left Geraldton to lighten her. The task of refloating Koombana took several more days, with the officers and crews of both ships working day and night.  On 24 March 1909, Winfield herself ran aground for half an hour, while turning to come alongside.  An attempted tow that day was unsuccessful, but at 14:30 the next day, after cargo had been taken out of Koombanas forehatch, she was finally refloated.

Meanwhile, there was disquiet in Carnarvon about the non-arrival of the mails being carried by Koombana. In a telegram to the Postmaster-General in Melbourne, Carnarvon's town clerk complained that the monthly delivery of mails had been delayed by eight days. Further north, the Port Hedland Advocate called for Shark Bay to be cut off the list of north-west trade calling places, due to its ever-shifting sand banks. However, Koombana was largely forgiven when she arrived in Carnarvon a few days later, even though a quantity of Carnarvon cargo had to be overcarried. Residents and the local media marvelled at the comfort of her cabins, while passengers spoke highly of the efforts of the officers and crew to refloat the stricken vessel.

Koombanas second north west trip, departing from Fremantle on 17 April 1909, was similarly eventful.  In Geraldton on 21 April 1909, the vessel embarked a ministerial party comprising the Premier, Newton Moore, and the Minister for Works, James Price, accompanied by four other State MPs. The party had journeyed from Perth to Geraldton by train, and then continued by Koombana all the way to Derby, before returning by Koombana to Fremantle. Its objective was to visit the North-West ports, inspect recent Public Works projects, and "... meet the residents of the various ports and ascertain their wants ...". A highlight of the party's tour was the opening on 27 April 1909 of the new Port Hedland jetty, at which Koombana had just become the first ship to berth.  The jetty's construction had been expedited to enable the landing of the rails for construction of the Marble Bar Railway.

It seems that the occurrence of this incident was not immediately publicised, and that on arrival at Derby the vessel was examined and no damage was found. However, this time Koombanas misfortune became the subject of a Court of Marine Inquiry investigation. After hearing evidence on 7 August 1909, the Court, consisting of Mr E P Dowley, RM, and Captains Cutler and Foxworthy, observed that an uncharted rock had since been found in the vicinity, and that the course set by Captain Rees, under the guidance of the then available Admiralty chart, was perfectly safe through Roebuck Deep. The Court therefore dismissed a charge of laxity brought against the Captain, exonerated him, and returned his certificate.

Meanwhile, on 12 May 1909, Koombana had departed from Fremantle on her third north west trip.  Even though by that stage the Broome incident had been made public, The West Australian announced her impending departure with considerable enthusiasm:

On her recent trip she put up a tremendous performance for consistent fast steaming, and fully justified her claim to be ranked as one of the most speedy vessels on the Australian coastal trade.  The demand for berths is still very keen, and on this trip she will take away a full complement of passengers.

However, during the ensuing journey Koombana was found to be making water in one of her tanks.  On arrival at Broome, an examination revealed that some of the cement on the bottom of the tank had broken away, and that one of the rivets had broken off. This meant that repairs were necessary.

Repairs in Sydney
In the absence of docking facilities in Fremantle, the Adelaide Steamship Co decided, at considerable expense, to send Koombana to Sydney to have her thoroughly examined and repaired. She steamed there from Fremantle after completing her third north west trip, stopping only in Albany to land 100 tons of cargo on the way. Her place on the north west run was filled temporarily by Huddart, Parker & Co.'s liner Burrumbeet, which was detained for that purpose at the last minute.

Koombana arrived in Sydney on the night of 13 June 1909, and was floated into Mort's Dock the next morning. According to one newspaper report, the Sydney docking revealed that – contrary to earlier reports in Western Australia – the grounding in Shark Bay had caused significant damage, namely 13 broken plates.  "She was evidently kept afloat only by the top skin of her ballast tanks", the report commented. After undergoing repairs, Koombana returned to Fremantle in August 1909, taking up the westward run of Kyarra while she was undergoing a thorough overhaul.  Burrumbeet then departed from Fremantle to take up Kyarras eastward run.

Later service

Following Koombanas return from Sydney, she settled into a regular routine of monthly trips from Fremantle up the coast, with annual diversions to the eastern states for an overhaul.  However, the routine continued to be punctuated by unusual events.

In June 1910, Koombana took another ministerial party on part of a tour of the north west, when the Colonial Secretary, Mr J D Connolly, travelled aboard her between Fremantle and Port Hedland.  During the tour, the Minister inaugurated the steam traction on the Cossack–Roebourne tramway, using a steam engine that had similarly been conveyed to the scene by Koombana.  After leaving that vessel at Port Hedland, the Minister continued his trip to Derby and back to Fremantle aboard another vessel, Penguin.

Two months later, on 26 August 1910, the general manager in Western Australia of the Adelaide Steamship Company, Mr W E Moxon, hosted a luncheon on board Koombana at Fremantle, for members of the Fremantle Chamber of Commerce and the Australasian Steamship Owners' Federation.  The luncheon also marked the return from London of the Premier, Sir Newton Moore, and the Collector of Customs.  Sir Newton himself was unable to be present, but two other Ministers deputised for him.  Toasts were proposed to King George V, who had recently succeeded to the throne, and to Koombana, amongst others.  After the luncheon, guests inspected the McIlwraith, McEacharn & Co interstate liner Karoola.

There was drama aboard Koombana in the early hours of 20 October 1910, when a fire broke out in the No 1 cargo hold, during a voyage between Port Hedland and Broome.  The hatch was sealed down, and the vessel's Clayton Patent fire extinguisher used to put out the blaze.  Passengers awoke later in the morning to find their cabins full of smoke, and Koombana heading at full speed for Port Hedland.  Following her arrival there at noon, portions of the vessel remained very hot, and the no 2 hold was also sealed down.  The cause of the fire was attributed to a cargo of wet wool that had been loaded at Shark Bay earlier in the trip.

When Koombana berthed at Fremantle on the afternoon of 27 October 1910 at the end of the trip, the fire was still smouldering.  A considerable quantity of water was then pumped into the hold, and by the time hatches were removed, the outbreak had been completely subdued.  Although the cargo was damaged by fire and water, no damage was detected to the vessel.

Koombana therefore formed the centrepiece of a welcoming flotilla of vessels, which was also made up of the survey sloop , and numerous schooners and luggers. Two additional days of celebrations then followed.

A second Koombana grounding in Shark Bay took place on the morning of 20 December 1910, as the vessel steamed from Carnarvon to Denham.  Koombana struck a sandbank, and was held fast for 12 hours. The dense volumes of blue smoke rising from the ship while her officers strove to free her caused some consternation in Denham, where observers feared a volcano might be erupting near Dirk Hartog Island. Although a motor launch was despatched to Denham to report the grounding, Koombana was able to slide off the bank, and catch up with the launch, before it reached its destination.

Late in the evening of 21 January 1911, a second fire broke out aboard Koombana, this time while she was berthed at Victoria Quay, Fremantle.  About four or five tons of fodder stored in the Nos 2 and 3 cargo holds were discovered to be ablaze, apparently by spontaneous combustion.  The Fremantle Fire Station quickly sent a fire engine, and soon afterwards the Harbour Trust fire plant was requisitioned.  Once again the holds were flooded.  By 4 am on 22 January 1911, the fire was pronounced extinguished, and again the vessel appeared to be undamaged.  A smoke helmet sent over by the captain of the German-Australian liner Augsburg did not need to be used, but greatly impressed the fire brigade staff.

On 19 April 1911, Koombana was the innocent victim of a collision while tied up at Victoria Quay.  The master of another steamer, SS Pilbarra, became confused by the hoisting of berthing flags.  He went astern, to prevent his vessel from striking the wharf.  Pilbarra then swung around, and struck the starboard quarter of Koombana. A Court of Marine Inquiry later found that the master of Pilbarra had committed an error of judgment.

On 6 September 1911, Koombana arrived at Fremantle after undergoing her annual overhaul in Sydney.  Captain Rees had been transferred to SS Winfield, and Koombana had come under the command of Captain Thomas M Allen.

Industrial trouble

An incident aboard Koombana in early November 1911 led to an industrial dispute so serious that it had ramifications well beyond Western Australia.  As Koombana steamed south on her way between Shark Bay and Geraldton, her chief steward, Frank Johnson, entered the bakehouse.  He allegedly abused, and broke a loaf of bread over the head of, the young baker, a German named Edwin Albrecht.  After Koombana arrived in Fremantle, Albrecht summoned Johnson to the Fremantle Police Court for using insulting and abusive language towards him, but at the hearing on 10 November 1911, Resident Magistrate Dowley dismissed the summons, and ordered that neither party pay the other's costs.

By that time, Albrecht had gained the sympathy of Koombanas crew.  At a meeting of the Seamen's Union held in Fremantle the same evening, a large majority of the 60 members present, including representatives from other vessels, decided that the crew of Koombana should not resume work until the chief steward was removed from the steamer.  The decision was immediately conveyed to Captain Allen and the acting manager of the Adelaide Steamship Company, Mr A E Lewis.

In light of these events, Koombanas agents decided on 11 November 1911 to delay indefinitely her next departure.  During that day, the postal authorities were notified that the mail contract would have to be suspended for the time being, and 16 firemen were paid off.  Subsequently, the general secretary of the Firemen and Seamen's Union, Mr Cooper, sent the crew a wire message from Sydney advising them to work on, to avoid seriously jeopardising a case before the Arbitration Court in the eastern states.

On 17 November 1911, the recently elected new Premier, John Scaddan, intervened in the dispute, at the request of Labor Senators.  He sent a delegation of two State MPs to a mass meeting of the union in Fremantle.  The two MPs urged the crew to return to work, on the understanding that an investigation of their complaints would be made.  The delegation, together with two union representatives, then met with Captain Allen and the acting manager at the company's office.  The company promised a thorough investigation into the grievances.  Captain Allen guaranteed that food supplies would be of good quality and quantity, and that the chief steward should treat the firemen with respect.  But after the delegation had reported back to the mass meeting, the members present voted overwhelmingly not to go back aboard, unless the chief steward was transferred to another vessel.

Further negotiations followed between Mr Moxon, the WA general manager of the company, and the protesting firemen.  Mr Moxon claimed that it would be an act of persecution to dismiss the chief steward without an inquiry being held into the allegations against him.  However, the firemen were unmoved.  At the request of Senator Guthrie, the general secretary of the Firemen and Seamen's Union in Melbourne, Mr Moxon then broke off the negotiations.  Meanwhile, Senator Guthrie arranged for a fresh crew of 16 men, accompanied by two executive officers, to travel from Melbourne to Adelaide by express train, and from Adelaide to Fremantle by steamer.

On 24 November 1911, the chief steward "fell down in a fit" and was taken to a private hospital. The same day, the President of the Commonwealth Arbitration Court, Mr Justice H B Higgins, sitting in Melbourne, delivered his proposed award in the claim by the Federated Seamen's Union against the Commonwealth Steamship Owners.  Although Mr Justice Higgins indicated that he proposed to grant the union's main demands, he then observed that Koombanas crew, in defiance of the union's executive, was breaching the existing agreement.  In those circumstances, he deferred for a week the making of an award, and indicated that he would not do so at all if the position of Koombana did not change.

Five days later, on the evening of 29 November 1911, the fresh crew for Koombana arrived in Fremantle from the eastern states aboard the SS Riverina.  They were immediately signed on.  The vessel sailed the next day, 30 November 1911, with her crew including chief steward Johnson, who had recovered. News of the resolution of the dispute was then sent by telegram to Melbourne, where it was welcomed by Mr Justice Higgins.

Demise

Cyclone

Koombana left Port Hedland for Broome on the morning of Wednesday, 20 March 1912 with a fresh north easterly blowing, followed by the SS Bullarra, which had recently returned to the north-west passenger and cargo trade. Before departing, her master, Captain Allen, had reported a falling barometer and suggested that the voyage may take longer than normal. However, he and Captain Upjohn, master of Bullarra, had decided in conversation prior to departure that there was nothing in it, and neither of them had expected to encounter such a blow as was later recorded in Bullarras log book as "A Howling Hurricane".

Several hours after departing, the two ships altered course as a heavy north easterly gale set in and they became separated.  The storm increased and Bullarra suffered damage but was able to limp into Cossack.  She later returned to Port Hedland minus her smokestack reporting that the eye of the cyclone had passed directly over.  Koombana was not seen again.

A steel sailing ship, Crown of England, was wrecked on Depuch Island with another vessel, Concordia beached nearby.  Several lighter vessels and pearling luggers were also sunk or wrecked.

The cyclone crossed the coast two days later on 22 March just west of Balla Balla, a minor port for the Whim Creek copper mines.  Damage was reported for more than 200 kilometres along the coast.

After the ship became overdue in Broome several days later, public concern was raised and a search organised. In the end, the only wreckage recovered from Koombana was part of a starboard bow planking of a motor launch, a state-room door, and panel from the promenade deck, two planks for covering tanks of lifeboats, and some air tanks. Apart from the air tanks, which were found on the mainland, all of the recovered wreckage was picked up at sea.

Passengers

Prominent passengers

Aboard Koombana at the time of her loss were a number of passengers who had been playing prominent roles in the north of Western Australia.  They included the following:
Captain Pearson, who was the wharfinger at Derby, to which he was travelling.  An old sea captain, he had formerly been employed by Melbourne Steamship Company, and had lived for many years in Fremantle, where he was very well known.
Corporal Frank Buttle, who had been in charge of the Derby police for about three years.  He had been returning from a holiday in Perth. His descendants include Brownlow Medal winning Australian rules footballer Graham Moss.
Mr George Simpson, the Department of Public Works official who had been in charge of public works on the north coast for a considerable time.  His last important work was in connection with the building of the lighthouse at Broome. Originally from NSW, Mr Simpson was a grandson of colonial innkeeper, pastoralist and politician Nicolas Hyeronimus. He was also more distantly related to the Suttor dynasty of early NSW politicians, and to Grosvenor Francis, member of the House of Representatives for the seat of Kennedy in Queensland between 1925 and 1929. He left a widow and six children.
Mr J S Davis, the manager of the Broome office of Siebe Gorman & Company Ltd, "submarine engineers".
Mr W P Milne, of the Department of Public Works, who was proceeding to Derby with a gang of five men – W Davis, A Baker, G Martin, H Hereford and E Green – to carry out works. For a very long time, he had been a member of a government boring party, and had done a lot of boring work on one of the stock routes in the far north.
Messrs George Piper and R H Jenkins, who were both managers of stations for Emanuel Brothers Limited, and were returning to Derby from a trip to Perth.  As of 1912, Emanuel Brothers were prominent suppliers of stock and meat to Perth and the goldfields. George Piper had previously been employed by Sidney Kidman, who had sent him to Western Australia to manage Meda Station for Forrest and Emanuel, which he had done very successfully.  He was accompanied aboard Koombana by his brother, Alfred C Piper, another ex-Kidman employee.  Mr Kidman was quoted after Koombanas disappearance as saying that "George was one of the smartest men they have had in the west, and his brother was a very capable man, too." Mr Jenkins had been a stock manager for Emanuel Brothers for over a decade, and was accompanied on Koombana by his daughter.
Mr Deane Sparke, who was a storekeeper in Derby.  He had been returning from holidays in Perth.
Mr Frederick W B Clinch, of Elder, Shenton & Co, who had been on his way to Derby to supervise the loading of cattle onto Bullarra. His father, James Clinch, had been the founder of the Berkshire Valley farm near Moora, and the first European settler in the Moora area. Frederick Clinch left a widow and six daughters.
Captain Charles Brown Stuart, who was engaged in pearling on his own account, and was returning to Broome from a business trip to Port Hedland.
Mr Abraham de Vahl Davis, a resident of Broome, and manager of the Australian business of his brother-in-law, Mr Mark Rubin, whose business interests embraced pearling, pastoral and other business concerns. Mr de Vahl Davis was an uncle of Mark Rubin's son, Bernard Rubin, who won the 1928 24 Hours of Le Mans, in a Bentley 4½ Litre.  His descendants include Graham de Vahl Davis, Emeritus Professor in the School of Mechanical & Manufacturing Engineering at the University of New South Wales.
Rev Robert W Main, who had been travelling north on behalf of the Presbyterian Church of Western Australia to find a suitable place for a mission station for Aborigines.
 

List of passengers
The passengers on Koombana when she left Port Hedland on her ill-fated trip to Broome were recorded as follows:
 For Derby:Saloon:
Captain Pearson
Mr A C Piper
Mr F Forrest
Mr S H Slade
Mr R H Jenkins
Mr E J Dalton
Mr J Hayes
Mr Dean Spark
Mr W W Purcell
Mr W Poor
Mr F Rustle
Mr W P Milne
Mr W Smith

 
 
Mr J McGowan
Mr F W B Clinch
Mr W L Cowan
Mr Jas Craigie
Mr A S Taylor
Miss Jenkins
Mr G Piper
Miss Price
Mrs Sack
Mr R Pearson
Mr W J Davies
Mr Thomas Barry
Corporal Buttle

 
 
Steerage:
Mr W L Davey
Mr A Baker
Mr G Martin
Mr H Hurford
Mr E Green
Mr M Vasey
Mr D McSwain

 
 
Mr W J McKibbin
Mr W E Vile
Mr J Doyle
Mr T Goddard
Mr T Quinland
Mr R Quinland

 For Broome:'Saloon:Captain Stuart
Mr H Brider
Mr J S Davis
Mr G N Simpson
Mr G Harper
Miss S Skamp

 
 
Miss G Skamp
Mrs Piggott
Rev R W Main
Mrs Gilliam
Miss Gilliam

 
 Steerage:Mr J Murphy
Mr Drake
Mr J Johnson
John Evans
W Smith

 
 
G Bailey
A McRouble
"a Japanese"
"an aboriginal"
"Malay prisoners"

 

Crew

Master

Captain Thomas M Allen, master of Koombana on her last voyage, was a 52-year-old bachelor. Born in South Australia, he had been educated at Port Adelaide Grammar School. His father, Thomas Allen was a Cork Irishman who had been a shipmaster and owner between the 1850s and 1880s, and had frequently visited Albany and Fremantle. As a child, Tom Allen had sailed with his parents around Australia, and later to New Caledonia.  In 1873, he had sailed from Port Darwin aboard the barque Constant, commanded by his father, for Rockingham, Western Australia, to load jarrah, but Constant was wrecked at Rockingham, after blowing from her anchors during a north-westerly gale.

Early in his seafaring career, Captain Allen worked on sailing ships, as master of a tug, and on several occasions for the Adelaide Steamship Company.  As quartermaster of the Orient Steam Navigation Company's , he was one of a couple of hands who, in heavy seas, volunteered to go over her stern and secure her propeller, after she had broken her screw shaft.  He also commanded several vessels, beginning with the barque Verulam.  In 1897, as commander of the coastal vessel , he was convicted by a jury of manslaughter because a man had fallen down a hold, but the verdict was ignored by the Attorney-General.

Later that year, Captain Allen was appointed to the pilot service on the Port Adelaide River.  In 1901, he was chosen to take the royal yacht  up the river, on the occasion of the visit to Australia of the then Duke and Duchess of Cornwall and York (later King George V and Queen Mary). One of the most skilful navigators in Australia, he was the first South Australian born seafarer to be awarded an extra masters certificate.

Following a voyage to Valparaíso in Echunga, he commanded many of the company's coastal steamers, including , Bullarra and Winfield. During his career as master and pilot, he had experienced no mishaps prior to Koombanas disappearance.

Other crew
Mr Norman Jamieson, chief officer of Koombana at the time of her loss, had formerly been chief officer of the equally ill-fated .

Also working on Koombana at the time of her loss was F W Johnson, chief steward, who had been at the centre of the industrial troubles some four months earlier.  Like Captain Allen, he was originally from South Australia.  His brother-in-law and niece were also on board for Koombanas fateful last trip.

List of the crew
According to the records in the Adelaide Steamship Company's offices, the complete crew that left with Koombana was:

Thomas M Allen, master.
N C Jamieson, chief officer.
W R A Kinley, second officer.
F G Peacock, third officer.
F H Harris, purser.
J Levins, boatswain.
H A Lyan, wireless telegraph operator.
T M Grant, ship's carpenter.
P C Clinton, F Wilson, H B Rea, C Stanley, F McDonnell, William A Farrell, W Carton, M Ryan, M Dwyer, P Jenkins, J McGuckin, and F Gunning, ABs.
M Stuart and F Herbert, ordinary seamen.

 
W B Innes, chief engineer.
A Wassell, second engineer.
W Kelly, third engineer.
A G Christie, fourth engineer.
J G Arrow, fifth engineer.
J Kearns, donkeyman.
W Clarke, J Smith, J Brown, O Norton, C Anderson, C Furlong, H Offord, O Olsen, W Fitzpatrick, A C de Montfort, T O'Loughlin, T McDermott, Thos Taylor, A Bryant, J Downie and C Peters, firemen.

 
F W Johnson, chief steward.
J J Mangan, second steward.
A Freer, stewardess.
J McDermott, assistant stewardess.
J Coughlan, fore cabin steward.
H Stanley, bar and store keeper.
G A Gee, saloon waiter.
W B Black, pantryman.
H Bow, night watchman.
Walter Tutt, chief cook.
H Stanbery, second cook.
G Jones, third cook.
J Jackson, kitchenman.
A G Leller, baker.
C Walker, butcher.
E Davies, scullion.
P Farrance, A Deerham, C H Benedicte, E Wardlaw, J Hughes, J Blades, A Salkild, S W Reynolds, F J Winpenny, Wm Dick, James Crosbie, Wm Cant, R Davis, W Burkin, H Smith, and P Finnerty, stewards.

Aftermath
On 21 April 1912, a memorial concert in memory of the victims of Koombanas loss was held at His Majesty's Theatre, Perth.  It was attended by many dignitaries, and hundreds of other people.  In an address to the audience, the newly elected Dean of Perth, the very Reverend H F Mercer, earnestly appealed for support to the Koombana relief fund, which had been established by the Lord Mayor of Perth and owner of the theatre, Mr T G Molloy.

Following the loss of Koombana, her owner, the Adelaide Steamship Company, arranged for one of its other vessels, the SS Allinga, to replace her on the northwest run. Soon afterwards, the company withdrew Allinga from the northwest coastal trade, after it lost the contract for that trade to the State Shipping Service of Western Australia, which had recently been established by the Scaddan government.  The company's withdrawal was a major impetus for the early development of the State Shipping Service, which was to dominate the northwest trade for the rest of the twentieth century.

Court of Marine Inquiry
At request of the Colonial Secretary, a Court of Marine Inquiry investigation into the loss of Koombana was held at Fremantle, just over a month after her disappearance.  The Court was composed of Mr E P Dowley (President) and Captains F L Parkes and J W W Yates (assessors). Evidence was led on 25, 26 and 29 April 1912 by the Crown Prosecutor (Mr Frank Parker) on behalf of the Chief Harbourmaster, and a closing address was made on 3 May 1912 by Mr M L Moss KC, on behalf of Adelaide Steamship Company.

The Court gave its decision on 10 May 1912.  It found that Koombana had sailed from Port Hedland at about 10:20 am on 20 March 1912, drawing  aft and about  forward.  She had been in excellent trim, and with her propeller well submerged.  She had shaped a course to round Bedout Island on her way to Broome, on a voyage that was usually accomplished in about 24 hours.  The southward-bound Bullarra, which had departed about half an hour later, had had Koombana in sight until about noon.  At about 6:30 pm that day, the wind had increased until it became a violent hurricane lasting for several hours, and Koombana had not been seen or heard of since.

The Court could not say what actually had happened to Koombana, but it seemed reasonably clear that the hurricane had been responsible for her total loss at sea.  When leaving Port Hedland, she had been carrying a load of 260 tons of cargo, properly stowed, 460 tons of coal, 871 tons of water in her tanks, some 60 tons of stores, a total of 76 passengers and a crew of 74.  The stability of the vessel with her known load had been tested with Ralston's stability indicator, and seven other tests had been made with the indicator under varying conditions of load.  In each test, Koombanas stability had been shown to be entirely satisfactory.

Further confirmation of the ship's stability and seaworthiness was to be found in her career.  All witnesses with experience in her had deposed to her very excellent seagoing qualities.  Both Captain Allen and the chief officer had held extra masters' certificates, and had been men of great experience on the Australian coast.  The Court was satisfied that Koombana, in construction, stability and seaworthiness, was equal to any vessel in her class in the Australian coastal trade.  It concluded that her stability and seaworthiness were unassailable, the competency and carefulness of her master were beyond question, and that after being lost sight of at sea on 20 March 1912, "... her fate passes beyond human knowledge and remains a mystery of the sea."

Theories about the loss

The Court's findings have not been universally accepted.  A number of commentators have asserted that Koombana was a "top heavy" vessel. She is said to have been "... built to scrape into the most horrible little bays and estuaries", and "... slightly unstable because [she] had to be shallow enough to get over the sandbar at Port Hedland".  Koombana has also been described as narrow-bottomed, wide-topped and built for speed more than anything else. In 1946, Edward Angelo, a former long time MLA for northwest electorates, who had travelled on over 100 ship voyages, wrote that "Although I greatly admired [Koombana's] appointments, I never liked her, considering her too top heavy.  She always had a list, even when tied up at jetties." However, the assertions made soon after the disappearance of Koombana that she was top heavy were disputed by her inaugural chief engineer.

Additionally, it has been asserted that when Koombana left Port Hedland, she was unballasted, so that she could cross the sandbar at the harbour's entrance.

In light of all of these assertions, there has been speculation that Koombana may have capsized in the heavy seas, due to a combination of structural top heaviness and empty ballast tanks.

In an article published on 19 May 1912, The Sunday Times (Perth, WA) observed that Koombana had not survived the first big storm she had encountered.  In response to the Court of Marine Inquiry's report, the article commented that "[n]o attempt whatever was made to produce independent expert evidence as to the stability of the steamer, and by that we mean her ability to live in a cyclone, and not her constructional strength."  The article went on to report a number of comments by a Port Hedland journalist, Mr Barker, on the Court's findings.  According to Mr Barker, who had interviewed Captain Allen in Port Hedland, many pearling luggers had run into the creek for shelter prior to Koombanas departure from Port Hedland, and Captain Allen himself had been reluctant to depart until after speaking with Captain Upjohn.  Mr Barker also claimed that upon departure, Koombana had had "an ugly list to port", and "was rolling heavily, her propeller at times being out of the water".

Against that background, The Sunday Times called for a second inquiry, by the Federal government, but no such inquiry was held.

Possible discoveries
In 1985, crew members testing magnetic detection equipment on a Lockheed P-3 Orion of the Royal Australian Air Force reported a significant magnetic anomaly on the seabed 75 km off Bedout Island.

In August 1987, a specially equipped United States Navy research aircraft was sent to Port Hedland to search for the ship in conjunction with the National Oceanic and Atmospheric Administration (NOAA) and an Australian research group. The aircraft, another Lockheed Orion (RP-3D BuNo. 158227, operated in support of NOAA's Project Magnet), equipped with a vector magnetometer, was flown by a US Navy crew with project scientists from NOAA. The Naval Officer crew consisted of aviators Deborah Anderson, Brad Huotari and Glenn Gosnell with navigators John Sheppard and Ruth Perron. The unique aircraft was painted international orange and white and had the "Road Runner" cartoon as nose art. Several flights were conducted over the suspected area of the ship, searching for magnetic anomalies. Several promising "hits" were to be investigated by the Australian group.

In the years leading up to the centenary of Koombana's loss, numerous deepwater expeditions have been held to find her wreck, but as of the centenary the wreck had still not been found.

Legacy

The death pearl
On board Koombana at the time of her loss was a Broome resident and pearl dealer, Abraham de Vahl Davis was on board, the secretary of Mark Rubin, who had purchased the "Roseate Pearl" for 12,000 Australian pounds. The loss led to Mark Rubin buying De Grey in 1912 with 63,000 sheep for a 100,000 pounds, and Mulyie and Warrawagine Stations in 1916 providing the wool for the British Army in WW1 and WW2. Davis boarded Koombana there for the voyage to Broome, supposedly taking Roseate Pearl with him. Mark travelled to Europe after the loss of the Koombana to try and recuperate the loss and realised the world was going to war and sold Broome Pearls and bought the Stations. Jenny Hardie's book "Nor'Westers of the Pilbara breed" and Ion Iedress' book "Forty Fathoms deep" verifies the ownership of the pearl. Legend had seven of the previous owners die after acquiring the pearl. Following Koombanas disappearance, a further legend grew, blaming her loss on this allegedly cursed jewel.

100th anniversary commemorations
In early 2012, to commemorate the centenary of the loss of Koombana, the Port Hedland Historical Society organised a program of activities for the weekend of 17–18 March 2012.  The program included a Captain's Table dinner, the ceremonial laying of floral tributes at Port Hedland's Koombana lookout and an exhibition of artefacts at Dalgety House Cottage.  At least 13 descendants of those lost on Koombana were planning to make the trip to Port Hedland for the weekend. However, on 15 March 2012 the Society was forced to postpone the event, due to the impending approach of Tropical Cyclone Lua.

On 24 March 2012, a Koombana'' centenary exhibition went on display at the Western Australian Maritime Museum in Fremantle.  The exhibition, which was replicated in Port Hedland, was developed by the Western Australian Museum in consultation with the Port Hedland Historical Society, with financial support from the Port Hedland Port Authority.  According to WA Museum chief executive Alec Coles, "The exhibition relates what is known of Koombana’s final hours, and describes the far-reaching search which took place following her disappearance."

The Port Hedland Historical Society's postponed commemorative activities were rescheduled to the weekend of 27–28 April 2012; the program culminated in the laying of a wreath for those lost on board the vessel.

See also

List of maritime disasters
Shipwrecks of Western Australia

References

Notes

Bibliography

 online

External links

Airliners.net – image of the Lockheed RP-3D Orion search aircraft – at Perth Airport, 28 May 1988
 
ANU Digital Collections – high resolution images – SS Koombana at Fremantle – close-up of SS Koombanas decks

 – includes mp3 audio files of interviews with Annie Boyd and Graham de Vahl Davis
 – video presentation – Peter Harvey looks at Australia's Titanic – the true story of the S S Koombana

Shipwrecks of Western Australia
Maritime incidents in 1909
Maritime incidents in 1910
Maritime incidents in 1911
Maritime incidents in 1912
Koombana SS
Missing ships
1909 ships
Missing ships of Australia
Ships lost with all hands
Adelaide Steamship Company